Schnirch is a surname. Notable people with the surname include:

 Bedřich Schnirch (1791–1868), Czech engineer
 Bohuslav Schnirch (1845–1901), Czech sculptor, designer, and preservationist
 Oskar Schnirch (1902–1995), Austrian cinematographer